Adèle Van Reeth (born 1982), is a French philosopher, radio producer and columnist.

Life

Studies, family 
Van Reeth is the only daughter in a family of four children. She is of Flemish origin by her paternal grandfather. Daughter of an archivist, she moved a lot in her childhood due to her father's assignments.

When she was 15 she spent one year in New Zealand. After studying architecture for a few months, she joined a khâgne where she prepared for the entrance exam to the École normale supérieure de Lyon. Once admitted, she went for the second year of study at the University of Chicago.

She gave birth to a boy in May 2016.

Career 
A specialist in film philosophy former student of the École normale supérieure de Fontenay-Saint-Cloud (promotion 2005) Van Reeth works and intervenes on the question of the ordinary, based in particular on the work of the philosopher Stanley Cavell.

While she is eligible for the oral examinations of the philosophy agrégation, she finally prefers to leave this path to work in radio. Since September 2011, on France Culture, she has been producing and hosting the daily philosophy program Les Nouveaux Chemins de la connaissance alongside Raphaël Enthoven which was renamed Les Chemins de la philosophie in 2017. In December 2012, this program became the most downloaded show of Radio France, and maintains this position from time to time.

In March 2014, she launched a series entitled "Questions de Caractère". (co-edition Plon / France Culture): she interacts with contemporary philosophers while keeping the spirit and approach of her program. The first volume, co-written with Jean-Luc Nancy, deals with jouissance, a theme on which she has already spoken several times.
On December 19, 2017, it was announced that Van Reeth would take over from Jean-Pierre Elkabbach and host the new literary program of Public Sénat, still recorded in the Senate Library, Livres & Vous.

From September 2018, she hosted the show  on France 2.

As of August 29, 2022, she is the director of France Inter, the leading radio station in the country.

Publications 
 La Jouissance in collaboration with Jean-Luc Nancy, co-edition Plon / France culture, 2014.
 Réussir le bac philo, under the direction of Adèle Van Reeth, Fayard, 2014.
 Le Snobisme in collaboration with Raphaël Enthoven, co-edition Plon / France culture, 2015.
 La Pudeur, in collaboration with Éric Fiat, co-edition Plon / France culture, 2016.
 Questions de caractère (compiles five themes addressed in the program: jouissance, malice, obstinacy, snobbery and modesty)

See also 

 Women in philosophy
 List of women philosophers
 Jean-Luc Nancy

References

External links 
 Les Nouveaux chemins de la connaissance on France Culture
 

1982 births
Living people
French people of Belgian descent
21st-century French philosophers
French television presenters
French women television presenters
French women philosophers
French women radio presenters
French radio presenters
French columnists
French women columnists
ENS Fontenay-Saint-Cloud-Lyon alumni
University of Chicago alumni
21st-century French women